Sandra Rabier (born 1 March 1985) is a rugby union player and represents . She was in the squad in the 2010 Women's Rugby World Cup and was named in the 2014 Women's Rugby World Cup.

References

1985 births
Living people
French female rugby union players